Reference Re Firearms Act is a leading constitutional decision of the Supreme Court of Canada on the division of powers regarding firearms legislation and the Canadian Firearms Registry. A unanimous Court held that the federal Firearms Act was constitutionally valid under the federal criminal law power.

Background
In 1995, the Parliament of Canada passed the Firearms Act, which required owners of rifles and shotguns to register them, and to obtain possession licences for them. (Handgun registration was already required by federal law.) 

The government stated that the law was passed under the authority of the federal government's criminal law power. The Firearms Act was closely integrated with the federal Criminal Code, so that failures to comply with the requirements of the former could in some cases be prosecuted as offences under the latter.

The government of Alberta submitted a reference question to the Alberta Court of Appeal to determine whether the Act was in relation to matters under the jurisdiction of the federal government. The government of Alberta argued the law was in relation to personal property and thus was a matter in the jurisdiction of the province. However, the federal government argued the law was in the realm of criminal law, which is under federal jurisdiction.

Opinion of the Court
The unanimous Court held that the pith and substance of the Act was in relation to "public safety" which was a matter within the criminal law power of the federal government. The Court cited the Margarine Reference for the requirements of criminal law and noted the danger of firearms, even if in some cases they could be used beneficially.  Indeed, the regulations were judged to promote responsible firearm ownership, and the Court went on to argue that there would be a moral danger if firearms are used irresponsibly (morality is an element in criminal law, as established in the Margarine Reference), although the Court said that it was not just a matter of morality that gave Parliament the authority to pass this legislation.

The Court also noted that firearms have been subject to federal regulation for years and that the government of Alberta could not reasonably challenge many of the earlier laws.

Finally, the Court rejected all arguments that the law was too expensive or disadvantageous to rural regions, as these were matters for Parliament to consider rather than legal issues liable to judicial review.

See also
 Quebec (AG) v Canada (AG): a follow-up case
 Gun politics in Canada
 List of Supreme Court of Canada cases (McLachlin Court)

References

External links
 
 intervener factum from Saskatchewan  
 text of the Firearms Act
 Charter argument against the Firearms Act

Canadian federalism case law
Canadian firearms law
Supreme Court of Canada cases
2000 in Canadian case law
Supreme Court of Canada reference question cases